The 2018 Sam Houston State Bearkats football team represented Sam Houston State University in the 2018 NCAA Division I FCS football season. The Bearkats were led by fifth-year head coach K. C. Keeler and played their home games at Bowers Stadium. They were a member of the Southland Conference. They finished the season 6–5, 5–4 in Southland play to finish in a four-way tie for fourth place.

Previous season
The Bearkats finished the 2017 season 12–2, 8–1 in Southland play to finish in second place. They received an at-large bid to the FCS playoffs where they defeated South Dakota in the first round and Kennesaw State in the quarterfinals before losing in the semifinals to North Dakota State.

Preseason

Preseason All-Conference Teams
On July 12, 2018, the Southland announced their Preseason All-Conference Teams, with the Bearkats having seven players at nine positions selected.

Offense

1st team

Davion Davis – Sr. WR

Nathan Stewart – Jr. WR

Mitchell Watanabe – Sr. OL

Eric David – Jr. OL

Tristan Wendt – Sr. OL

Davion Davis – Sr. all purpose player

Defense

1st team

Davion Davis – Sr. PR

2nd team

Chris Stewart – Sr. DL

Zyon McCollum – So. DB

Preseason Poll
On July 19, 2018, the Southland announced their preseason poll, with the Bearkats selected as the favorites to win the conference.

Award watch lists

Schedule

Source:

Game summaries

Prairie View A&M

Sources:

North Dakota

Sources:

at Nicholls State

Sources:

Central Arkansas

Sources:

vs Stephen F. Austin

Sources:

at Northwestern State

Sources:

at Lamar

Sources:

Southeastern Louisiana

Sources:

at Incarnate Word

Sources:

Abilene Christian

Sources:

at Houston Baptist

Sources:

Ranking movements

References

Sam Houston State
Sam Houston Bearkats football seasons
Sam Houston State Bearkats football